Prelusion is the debut album from jazz musician and later R&B recording artist Patrice Rushen.  The first of three albums she would record with Prestige Records, the album was mainly Instrumental jazz which was her main focus as an artist before focusing on popular R & B recordings four years later after signing with Elektra Records.  Released in 1974, the album showed great promise for Rushen in the Instrumental jazz genre with songs like "Haw-Right Now", "Shortie's Portion", and "Puttered Bopcorn".

The album only leaves people to speculate on where her career in jazz might have gone had she not switched to R&B singing in 1978.  In 1998, Prelusion was reissued along with Rushen's second album, Before the Dawn, on a single 77-minute CD; unfortunately, "Puttered Bopcorn" was deleted due to space limitations.

Track listing
All tracks composed and arranged by Patrice Rushen. 
 "Shortie's Portion" - 8:42
 "7/73" - 12:42
 "Haw Right Now" - 8:00
 "Traverse" - 10:53
 "Puttered Bopcorn" - 4:15

Personnel
Patrice Rushen – vocals, acoustic piano, electric piano, ARP synthesizer, clavinet 
 Tony Dumas – electric bass, "blitz" bass
 Leon "Ndugu" Chancler – drums, rhythm arrangement (5)
 Kenneth Nash – percussion
 Joe Henderson – tenor saxophone
 Hadley Caliman – flute, alto flute, soprano saxophone
 Oscar Brashear – trumpet, flugelhorn 
 George Bohanon – trombone

Production
 Producer – Reggie Andrews
 Recording Engineers – Eddie Harris and Skip Shimmin
 Remixing – Skip Shimmin
 Art Direction and Design – Phil Carroll
 Photography – Bruce Talamon
 Liner Notes – Gerald Wilson

References

1974 debut albums
Patrice Rushen albums
Prestige Records albums